The 44th Infantry Division was a division of the United States Army National Guard from October 1920 to November 1945, when it was inactivated after Federal Service during World War II. A second 44th Infantry Division existed in the Illinois Army National Guard from 1946 until October 1954, when that division was disbanded after federal service during the Korean War.

Formation
Originally named the 44th Division, it was constituted on 19 October 1920 as a National Guard Division, as a result of the National Defense Act of 1920's major expansion of the National Guard. As originally conceived, the division was to consist of National Guard units from the States of Delaware, New Jersey and New York, and was to form part of the Second Corps Area. However, only individual members of the division staff, and not any whole units, ended up being assigned to the state of Delaware. The 57th Infantry Brigade from the New Jersey Army National Guard (NJARNG) and the 87th Infantry Brigade of the New York Army National Guard (NYARNG) were incorporated almost immediately and growth continued piecemeal, as subordinate units were organized, until 1940. The shoulder sleeve insignia (unit patch) of the 44th Division was approved by the Secretary of War on 5 October 1921. The division was formally organized and federally recognized on 26 March 1924.

Interwar 
The 44th Division participated in the First Army Maneuvers in Upstate New York from 7–24 August 1940, prior to being inducted into federal service for twelve months of training on 16 September 1940. Posted at Fort Dix, New Jersey during 1940–1941, the division's training culminated in the Carolina Maneuvers, September–December 1941.

Order of Battle 
 HQ 44th Division
 57th Infantry Brigade
 113th Infantry Regiment
 114th Infantry Regiment
 87th Infantry Brigade
 71st Infantry Regiment
 174th Infantry Regiment
 69th Field Artillery Brigade
112th Field Artillery Regiment
156th Field Artillery Regiment
 157th Field Artillery Regiment
 44th Military Police Company
 44th Signal Company
 119th Ordnance Company
 104th Engineer Regiment
 119th Medical Regiment
 119th Quartermaster Regiment

World War II 
The division was en route to New Jersey on 7 December 1941, returning to Fort Dix when news was heard of the Japanese attack on Pearl Harbor. A regimental combat team, based on the 113th Infantry, was immediately detached from the division and attached to the Eastern Defense Command to provide ground forces for the defense of the East Coast from New York to Philadelphia. Shortly afterwards, the remainder of the division moved to Camp Claiborne, LA, where the 44th Division was reorganized and redesignated, the 44th Infantry Division on 16 February 1942.

The division was then sent to Fort Lewis Washington, where it participated in defense of the West Coast under the Western Defense Command for the remainder of 1942. In February 1943, the 44th Infantry Division, much reduced through the loss of personnel and units entered a period of rebuilding and training. After completing the "D-Series", division-level training, the 44th was sent to participate in the multi-division Fourth Army #6 Louisiana Maneuvers, 7 February-3 April 1944. The division then moved to Camp Phillips, KS for its final pre-deployment preparations. The division moved by railroad to Camp Myles Standish, Massachusetts, arriving on 24–27 August 1944; departing the United States via the Boston Port of Embarkation on 5 September 1944.

Order of battle

 Headquarters, 44th Infantry Division
 71st Infantry Regiment
 114th Infantry Regiment
 324th Infantry Regiment
 Headquarters and Headquarters Battery, 44th Infantry Division Artillery
156th Field Artillery Battalion (105 mm)
 157th Field Artillery Battalion (155 mm)
 217th Field Artillery Battalion (105 mm)
 220th Field Artillery Battalion (105 mm)
 63rd Engineer Combat Battalion
 119th Medical Battalion
 44th Cavalry Reconnaissance Troop (Mechanized)
 Headquarters, Special Troops, 44th Infantry Division
 Headquarters Company, 44th Infantry Division
 744th Ordnance Light Maintenance Company
 44th Quartermaster Company
 44th Signal Company
 Military Police Platoon
 Band
 44th Counterintelligence Corps Detachment

Combat chronicle 

The 44th Infantry Division landed in France via Cherbourg Naval Base, 15 September 1944, and trained for a month before entering combat, 18 October 1944, when it relieved the 79th Division in the vicinity of Foret de Parroy, east of Lunéville, France, to take part in the Seventh Army drive to secure several passes in the Vosges Mountains. Within 6 days, the division was hit by a heavy German counterattack, 25–26 October. The attack was repulsed and the 44th continued its active defense. On 13 November 1944, it jumped off in an attack northeast, forcing a passage through the Vosges Mountains east of Leintrey to Dossenheim, took Avricourt, 17 November, and pushed on to liberate Strasbourg, along with the 2d French Armored Division. After regrouping, the division returned to the attack, taking Ratzwiller and entering the Ensemble de Bitche in the Maginot Line. On 14 December, regiments of the 44th Division took part in assaulting major Maginot line fortifications. The division's 71st and 324th Infantry Regiments assaulted Fort Simserhof and nearby Hottviller. After six days of fighting, the unit captured Simershof on 20 December. Displacing to defensive positions east of Sarreguemines, 21–23 December, the 44th threw back three attempted crossings by the enemy of the Blies River.

An aggressive defense of the Sarreguemines area was continued throughout February 1945 and most of March. Moving across the Rhine at Worms, 26 March, in the wake of the 3d Division, the 44th relieved the 3d, 26–27 March, and crossed the Neckar River to attack and capture Mannheim, 28–29 March. Shifting to the west bank of the Main, the division crossed that river at Gross-Auheim in early April, and engaged in a 3-week training period. Attacking 18 April, after the 10th Armored Division, the 44th took Ehingen, 23 April, crossed the Danube, and attacking southeast, took Füssen, Berg, and Wertach, in a drive on Imst, Austria. On 2 May, a group of V-2 rocket scientists that included Wernher von Braun surrendered to the 44th. Pursuing the disintegrating enemy through Fern Pass and into the Inn River valley, the 44th set up its CP at Imst on 4 May. After a short period of occupation duty, the division returned to the United States in July 1945 for retraining prior to redeployment, but the end of the Pacific war resulted in inactivation in November 1945 at Camp Chaffee, Arkansas.

Casualties 

Total battle casualties: 5,655
Killed in action: 1,038
Wounded in action: 4,209
Missing in action: 100
Prisoner of war: 308

Assignments in ETO 
30 August 1944: Ninth Army, 12th Army Group.
5 September 1944: III Corps.
10 October 1944: Ninth Army, 12th Army Group.
14 October 1944: XV Corps, 6th Army Group, for supply.
17 October 1944: XV Corps, Seventh Army, 6th Army Group.
8 April 1945: Seventh Army, 6th Army Group.
15 April 1945: XXI Corps.
17 April 1945: VI Corps.

Campaigns 
World War II:
 Northern France (25 July – 14 September 44)(General Order (GO) #102, War Department (WD), 9 Nov 45)
 Rhineland (15 September 1944 – 21 March 1945 (GO #118, WD, 12 December 1945)
 Ardennes-Alsace (16 December 1944 – 25 January 1945 (GO #63, Department of the Army, 20 September 1948)
 Central Europe (22 March 1945 – 11 May 1945 (GO #116, WD, 11 December, 45)
 Days of combat: 190
 Distinguished Unit Citations: 3

Awards 
 Medal of Honor – 1.
 DSC – 38.
 Distinguished Service Medal (United States) – 2.
 Silver Star – 464.
 Legion of Merit – 8.
 Soldiers Medal – 6.
 Bronze Star – 2,647.
 Air Medal – 110.
 Legion of Honour – 1.

Commanders 
 Maj. Gen. Clifford R. Powell (September 1940 – August 1941).
 Maj. Gen. James I. Muir (August 1941 – August 1944).
 Maj. Gen. Robert L. Spragins (August 1944 – December 1944).
 Maj. Gen. William F. Dean (January 1945 – September 1945).
 Brig. Gen. William A. Beiderlinden (1 – 14 November 1945).
 Brig. Gen. Robert L. Dulaney (November 1945 – inactivation).
 Returned to U.S.: 21 July 1945.
 Inactivated: 30 November 1945.

Postwar 
The 44th Infantry Division was reactivated in the Illinois Army National Guard in 1946, and inducted into federal service in early 1952 during the Korean War. It was disbanded after its release from federal service on 10 October 1954.

On 15 June 2017 the 50th IBCT was reflagged as the 44th Brigade Combat Team, and carries the lineage of the 44th Infantry Division.

See also 

 U.S. Army Regimental System

Commanders of the 44th Infantry Division
{| border="0" cellspacing="0" cellpadding="20" align="center"
|-
|valign="top" width="33%"|
Major General Quincy A. Gillmore, March 1924 – November 1932
Major General John J. Toffey, January 1933 – June 1936
Major General Winfield S. Price, February 1937 – June 1939
Major General Clifford R. Powell, June 1939 – August 1941
Major General James I. Muir, August 1941 – August 1944
Major General Robert F. Spragins, August 1944 – December 1944
Brigadier General William F. Dean, December 1941 – March 1945
Major General William F. Dean, March 1945 – October 1945
Brigadier General Robert L. Dulaney, November 1945

References

External links 
 http://www.history.army.mil/documents/eto-ob/44ID-ETO.htm
 Website dedicated to the U.S. 44th Infantry Division

Divisions of the United States Army National Guard
044th Infantry Division, U.S.
Infantry Division, U.S. 044
Infantry divisions of the United States Army in World War II
Military units and formations disestablished in 1954
Military units and formations established in 1924